Leymus akmolinensis is a species of grass endemic to Russia and Kazakhstan.

Synonyms
 Aneurolepidium akmolinense (Drobow) Nevski
 Elymus akmolinensis Drobow
 Elymus dasystachys f. glaber Korsh.
 Leymus paboanus subsp. akmolinensis (Drobow) Tzvelev
 Leymus paboanus subsp. korshinskyi Tzvelev

References

 
 Botanicheskie Materially Gerbariia Botanicheskogo Instituta imeni V. L. Komarova Akademii Nauk SSSR 20: 430. 1960. (Bot. Mater. Gerb. Bot. Inst. Komarova Akad. Nauk SSSR)
 Flora URSS 2: 708. 1934. (Fl. URSS)
 Czerepanov, S. K. 1995. Vascular plants of Russia and adjacent states (the former USSR).
 The Plant List entry
 Encyclopedia of Life entry
 GBIF entry

akmolinensis
Grasses of Asia
Grasses of Europe
Grasses of Russia
Flora of Kazakhstan
Eurasian Steppe